Zinc finger CCCH-type containing 10 is a protein that in humans is encoded by the ZC3H10 gene.

References

Further reading 

Human proteins